Seven Guns for Timothy, also known as 7 magnifiche pistole,  Siete Pistolas para Timothy and Seven Magnificent Guns, is a 1966 Italian-Spanish Western directed by Romolo Guerrieri, written by Giovanni Simonelli and José Antonio de la Loma and starring Sean Flynn.

Plot
Timothy Benson, a young intellectual and greenhorn inherits a gold mine. Rodrigo Rodriguez, a bandido leader will stop at nothing to get Timothy to deed him the mine. It is up to Timothy's foreman and his friends to teach Timothy to be a tough hombre and with their help, stop the bandit, Rodrigo Rodriguez.

Cast

References

External links

Film page at BFI
Film page at Letterbox DVD
Seven Guns for Timothy at Spaghetti Western database

1966 films
Italian Western (genre) films
Spanish Western (genre) films
1960s Italian-language films
1960s English-language films
1960s Italian films